Oncerotrachelus pallidus is a species of assassin bug in the family Reduviidae. It is found in North America.

References

Further reading

 

Reduviidae
Articles created by Qbugbot
Insects described in 1922